The Arthurs Lake is a man-made reservoir located in the Central Highlands region of Tasmania, Australia. The lake was created in the 1920s by the Hydro-Electric Commission of Tasmania damming the Upper Lake River, Blue Lake and Sand Lake as well as the Morass Marsh. The principal purpose of the lake is to support the generation of hydroelectricity.

Location and features
It is located in the Central Highlands, north of Lyell Highway, east of Great Lake.  Water is pumped from Arthurs Lake to Great Lake, which feeds the Poatina Power Station. Some of the pumping energy is recovered by Tods Corner Power Station.

In 2017, Irrigation Tasmania installed a floating safety barrier to prevent fishing boats accessing the hydro intake pipe in this very popular fishing lake.

See also

List of reservoirs and dams in Tasmania

References

Central Highlands (Tasmania)
Reservoirs in Tasmania